Bernard Francis Bergin (20 September 1913 in Dublin – 17 June 1985 in Dublin) was an Irish cricketer. A right-handed batsman, he played twice for Ireland against New Zealand in September 1937. One of those matches had first-class status, and was notable for being one of the few first-class matches to begin and end on the same day.

References
CricketEurope Stats Zone profile
Cricket Archive profile
Cricinfo profile

1913 births
1985 deaths
Irish cricketers
Cricketers from Dublin (city)